High Peak Borough Council is the local authority for High Peak, a borough of Derbyshire, England. It forms part of the two-tier system of local government for High Peak, alongside Derbyshire County Council. The administrative base of High Peak Borough Council is split between sites in the towns of Buxton and Glossop. Full council meetings are usually held at the Octagon, Buxton. The whole council is elected once every four years. , the council is controlled by the Labour Party.

In February 2008, the council formed a strategic alliance with the neighbouring Staffordshire Moorlands District Council, an arrangement where both councils share a number of services and staff to keep costs as low as possible.

History
High Peak Borough Council was formed on 1 April 1974 by absorbing the municipal boroughs of Buxton and Glossop, the urban districts of New Mills and Whaley Bridge and the rural district of Chapel-en-le-Frith, all of which had previously been in the administrative county of Derbyshire, as well as the rural district of Tintwistle which had been in the administrative county of Cheshire.

At the May 2011 election the Conservative Party lost overall control of the council and it became No overall control, with the Labour Party having the largest number of seats but being short of a majority.

Shortly after taking office in 2007, the Conservative Party implemented a number of policies including contracting out the refuse and recycling services. The contract began in August 2008, and was continued by the succeeding Labour administration.

In June 2009, the ruling Conservative administration took the decision to dispose of the former council headquarters in Chinley, which also housed the location of full council meetings. The council said that disposal of the site would save £200,000 per year. The site has now been sold.

In April 2022, the Labour Party lost its majority control in the council, though still controlling to preside over the council with a minority-led government.

Administration

The council, made up of 43 councillors, is currently under no overall control. From the 2019 local election until the Cote Heath by-election on 7 April 2022, it was controlled by the Labour Party, which won 22 seats at the 2019 local election.

Leadership

The council is run by the "Leader and cabinet" model, where the Leader of the council – normally leader of the majority party – is selected by fellow councillors, who also select the Executive. At the 2019 local election, the Labour Party gained 5 seats and took control with a majority of six. Anthony McKeown became the Leader of the council and Damien Greenhalgh became the Deputy Leader of the council.

Executive

At the 2019 election, the Conservative Party lost its majority control of the council and the Labour and Co-operative Party became the largest party with 22 seats, gaining a majority of 6. The Executive's membership including the Leader and Deputy Leader remained at five councillors.

Mayor of the Borough of High Peak

The current Mayor is Ollie Cross, who was elected as Mayor of High Peak for 2022/2023.
The current Deputy Mayor is Graham Oakley.

Former Mayors of the Borough of High Peak include:
 Paul Hardy (2021/2022)
 Ed Kelly (2019/2020 and 2020/21 due to COVID-19)
 Linda Grooby (2018/2019)
 Matt Stone (2017/2018)
 Stuart Young (2015/16)
 Alan Barrow (2014/15)
 Tony Kemp (2013/14)
 Pat Jenner, (2012/13)
 David Lomax (2011/12)
 Graham Oakley (2010/11)

Electoral wards and councillors

Below is a list of all 43 serving councillors:

Arms

References

External links
High Peak Borough Council

Local government in Derbyshire
Non-metropolitan district councils of England
Billing authorities in England
High Peak, Derbyshire